DeRocco, de Rocco or Deroko is a surname of Italian origin that may refer to
Aleksandar Deroko  (1894–1988), Serbian architect, artist, and author
Jason DeRocco (born 1989), Canadian volleyball player
Jovan Deroko (1912–1941), Serbian military commander, cousin of Aleksandar
Linda De Rocco (born 1986), Italian ice hockey player
Stelio DeRocco (born 1960), Canadian volleyball player and coach, father of Jason

Italian-language surnames